James Stuart Kennedy (May 7, 1931 – November 8, 2021) was a Canadian football center and guard who played two seasons in the Interprovincial Rugby Football Union (IRFU) (now Canadian Football League (CFL) East Division) for the Ottawa Rough Riders. He played college football for Carleton and Queen's University and was the sixth overall draft pick in the 1953 IRFU College Draft.

After playing briefly for Carleton and from 1951–1952 on the Queen's University varsity team, Kennedy was selected with the sixth overall pick in the 1953 IRFU College Draft by the Ottawa Rough Riders. He played two seasons with Ottawa, appearing in a total of twenty games. 

He died on November 8, 2021, at the age of 90.

References

1931 births
2021 deaths
Canadian football guards
Canadian football centres
Carleton Ravens football players
Ottawa Rough Riders players